Chalicodoma is a subgenus of the bee genus Megachile in the family Megachilidae.

Species

 Megachile albocristata
 Megachile albonotata
 Megachile alborufa
 Megachile apennina
 Megachile atrocastanea
 Megachile baetica
 Megachile brunissima
 Megachile canescens
 Megachile cressa
 Megachile creutzburgi
 Megachile desertorum
 Megachile difficilis
 Megachile duala
 Megachile formosa
 Megachile fuerteventurae
 Megachile fulvohirta
 Megachile gessorum
 Megachile heinii
 Megachile hirsuta
 Megachile hungarica
 Megachile imperialis
 Megachile incerta
 Megachile insolita
 Megachile jeanneli
 Megachile karatauensis
 Megachile karooensis
 Megachile kashmirensis
 Megachile ladakhensis
 Megachile lefebvrei
 Megachile leonum
 Megachile lucidifrons
 Megachile magadiensis
 Megachile manicata
 Megachile marina
 Megachile mauritaniae
 Megachile mongoliae
 Megachile monstrifica
 Megachile montenegrensis
 Megachile morsitans
 Megachile murina
 Megachile nasidens
 Megachile nigrita
 Megachile palaestina
 Megachile pallida
 Megachile parietina
 Megachile pasteelsi
 Megachile povolnyi
 Megachile pseudofulva
 Megachile pyrenaica
 Megachile richtersveldensis
 Megachile roeweri
 Megachile rufescens
 Megachile rufitarsis
 Megachile sarahae
 Megachile sefrensis
 Megachile sicula
 Megachile sinensis
 Megachile tenorai
 Megachile wfkirbyi

References

Megachile
Taxonomy articles created by Polbot
Insect subgenera